Agrotis pierreti is a moth of the family Noctuidae. It is found in south-east Spain. In North Africa it is widespread from Morocco to Egypt. It is also found in Israel, Jordan, Iraq and Iran.

Adults are on wing from October to November. There is one generation per year.

External links
 Noctuinae of Israel

Agrotis
Moths of Europe
Moths of Africa
Moths of the Middle East
Moths described in 1837